Crocanthes celema is a moth in the family Lecithoceridae. It was described by John Hartley Durrant in 1915. It is found on New Guinea.

The forewings are purplish ferruginous, with a conspicuous canary-yellow triangular patch on the middle of the costa, reaching to beyond the cubitus. The yellow colouring is continued narrowly along the costa and termen to the tornus, expanding into a second costal triangle before the apex. The hindwings are shining, ochraceous.

References

Moths described in 1915
Crocanthes